Package theft, also known as porch piracy, is the theft of a package or parcel.  It can occur anywhere in the distribution channel including theft of packages left at a household. More specifically, it has been defined as, "Taking possession of a package or its contents, outside of a residence or business, where it has been commercially delivered or has been left for commercial pickup, with intent to deprive the rightful owner of the contents or even try to sell the contents.

Distribution channel

Packages, pallet loads, and full truck loads are subject to theft. This can take place anywhere from the shipper, carrier, or consignee.  It can involve individuals with an opportunity to take a  package or can involved organized crime.  Security systems involving surveillance systems, tracking systems, and broader corporate security are needed to resist the theft of material.  Estimates of cargo loss and theft range from two to thirty billion dollars a year.

Some theft involves package pilferage where all or part of the contents are taken from the package.  Sometimes a weight or object is placed into the pilfered package, the package is resealed, and then sent on its way through the remainder of the distribution system. Package tracking continues but the contents of the package could be gone.

Theft of delivered packages from households

The term porch piracy refers to a situation in which an individual steals a package from a porch or other area near the main entrance of a residence before the recipient can retrieve it. The problem is often underreported to the police, since major online retailers often return or refund items with no questions asked if the item is stolen. While the severity of the crime in the United States is usually only minor, as of 2019, many lawmakers have begun to push for punishments of increased severity due to the increase of such crimes. Porch piracy is unknown in countries where packages are never left unattended on a doorstep (e.g. in Germany) and generally does not occur in countries other than the US.

Incidence of theft 
The rate of package theft in the United States has been steadily increasing, with 90,000 packages disappearing daily in New York City alone in 2019, up 20 percent from four years prior. Across the country, more than 1.7 million packages are stolen or go missing daily, adding up to $25 million in lost goods and services.

An average family receives 27 packages a year, each year about 19% of the families have had a package stolen. That implies about probability of a package being stolen to be about 0.2 percent or higher. Most thefts occur when no one is at home. Thefts are more common during the holiday season. The average value an item stolen is about $140.

Methods of theft 

In suburbs and rural areas, some thieves follow delivery trucks and grab packages immediately after they are delivered.

In urban areas, packages are most often stolen from homes close to the roadway (within 25 feet), when a brand is displayed on the box, during daylight hours, and if the package is medium size and visible from the street.<ref name=":3" /

Severity of crime 
Package theft is often considered a minor crime that is not worthy of investigation by police. In most circumstances, once a package is delivered the resident would be considered the victim of a theft, but delivery companies and retailers often provide refunds or replacements; which impacts the entire supply chain. In New York City, such cases are considered petit larceny, unless the value is above $1000 USD, in which case they are considered grand larceny. In Texas, package theft is considered a Class C misdemeanor, the same type as a speeding ticket. However, in 2019, lawmakers across the United States began to push for more serious punishments. Three bills in the Texas Legislature, including HB 37 and HB 760, and a bill called the Defense Against Porch Pirates Act in South Carolina, proposed that package theft be considered a felony. In the Texas bill, thieves could face up to 10 years in prison.

Package theft prevention 

In buildings without doorbells, packages are often left in public areas that are easily accessed by thieves. The lack of an easy method to stop package theft has caused many to turn to neighbors to receive their packages for them. It has also led to increased income for businesses that offer mailbox services. The e-commerce company Amazon began offering delivery to car trunks or delivery lockers, or letting delivery people inside the home of the recipient with Amazon Key. It also began a program to share theft video from Ring doorbell cameras with police, but this led to controversy about privacy concerns. In addition, Amazon typically displays a selection and map of not only local delivery lockers, but participating business, including various postal service outlets, where packages can be delivered and held securely until the customer arrives to claim them.

Traditional prevention methods such as videos, fences, and obvious signs someone is home, do not appear to deter package theft. Prevention methods include concealing packages (e.g., removing branding on boxes, placing packages out of view), removing the target (e.g., delivery to a POD, delivery in late afternoons), increasing the effort (e.g., lockable containers), and increasing the risk (e.g., neighborhood watch, package alarms). Some individuals have taken to rigging decoy parcels with glitter bombs, low-grade explosives, blank round firing mechanisms, and even cat or dog feces in an effort to deter thieves.

See also 

 Package pilferage
 Package delivery
Supply chain security

References

Further reading
 
 Loss Prevention Magazine

Packaging
Theft
Commercial crimes
Security breaches